The 60th Operations Group (60 OG) is a United States Air Force unit assigned to the 60th Air Mobility Wing. It is stationed at Travis Air Force Base, California.

Established prior to World War II, its predecessor unit, the 60th Transport (later Troop Carrier) Group engaged in combat operations, first with the Eighth Air Force and primarily with Twelfth Air Force during the war. It received a Distinguished Unit Citation for its actions in the Mediterranean Theater of Operations, 28 March-15 September 1944. While attempting to organize effective fighting forces in Yugoslavia, Greece, and Albania, the Allies tasked the 60th for an immediate, substantial, and steady flow of desperately needed supplies. Despite poor weather, terrain, enemy night fighters, anti-aircraft fire, and hostile ground action, the 60th flew nearly 3,000 missions, including 600 hazardous landings, delivered more than 7,000 tons of supplies and equipment, and evacuated thousands of military and civilian personnel. The group lost 10 aircraft and 34 members of the 60th were either killed or listed as missing.

Overview
The 60th Operations Group is the flying component of the Air Mobility Command 60th Air Mobility Wing. The 60 OG is the largest Operations Group in Air Mobility Command. It operates and maintains C-5 Galaxy; C-17 Globemaster III transports and KC-10 Extender air refueling aircraft supporting global engagement of troops, supplies, and equipment.

Components
The 60 OG consists of the following squadrons:
 60th Operations Support Squadron
 6th Air Refueling Squadron – (KC-10 Extender)
 9th Air Refueling Squadron – (KC-10 Extender)
 21st Airlift Squadron – (C-17A Globemaster III)
 22d Airlift Squadron – (C-5M Super Galaxy)

History
 For additional history and lineage, see 60th Air Mobility Wing

World War II

Constituted on 20 November 1940 as the 60th Transport Group, the unit activated at Olmsted Field, Pennsylvania, on 1 December 1940, flying the C-47 aircraft. After a brief stay at Westover Field, Massachusetts (May 1941 – June 1942), the 60th moved to Chelveston, England, and then to Aldermaston, England, in August 1942. The group was redesignated as the 60th Troop Carrier Group on 1 July 1942.

The units next moved to Tafaraoui Airfield, Algeria, and was assigned to Twelfth Air Force. During the war in Europe, the 60 TCG also served from bases in Tunisia, Sicily, and Italy before moving to Waller Field, Trinidad, in June 1945. During World War II, the group participated in the battle for Tunisia; towed gliders and dropped paratroops behind enemy lines when the Allies invaded Sicily; and dropped paratroops at Megara during the airborne element of the liberation of Greece in October 1944. When not engaged in airborne operations, the group transported troops and supplies and evacuated wounded personnel. In October 1943, for instance, the 60th dropped supplies to men who had escaped from prisoner-of-war camps.

Received a DUC for supporting partisans in the Balkans, March–September 1944, making unarmed night missions to provisional airfields in Yugoslavia, Albania, and Greece. On return flights evacuated wounded partisans and escaped Allied personnel.

In June 1945, the 60 TCG moved to Trinidad and came under the command of the Air Transport Command. The group inactivated on 31 July 1945.

Cold War
After just 15 months on the inactive list, the 60th activated again on 30 September 1946, this time at Munich, Germany. Shortly after moving to Kaufbeuren Air Base, Germany, on 14 May 1948, the 60 TCG and its three squadrons—the 10th, 11th, and 12th Troop Carriers Squadrons—began supporting the Berlin Airlift. From 26 June 1948 to 30 September 1949, the C-47 and C-54-equipped squadrons flew from both Kaufbeuren AB and Wiesbaden AB, Germany, and contributed to the U.S. total of nearly 1.8 million tons of supplies delivered on 189,963 flights.

During the Berlin Airlift, the 60th Troop Carrier Wing, Medium, activated at Kaufbeuren AB on 1 July 1948. At that time the 60 TCG became a subordinate unit assigned to the new wing. Through its subordinate operations group—the 60th Troop Carrier Group, Heavy—the 60 TCW managed three flying squadrons: the 10th, 11th, and 12th Troop Carrier Squadrons.

When the Berlin Airlift ended on 26 September 1949, the 60 TCG began moving without its personnel and equipment to Wiesbaden AB, West Germany, where the wing assumed the resources of the inactivated 7150th Air Force Composite Wing. The 60th became operational at Wiesbaden on 1 October 1949. On 2 June 1951, the wing replaced the 61 TCW at Rhein-Main AB, where the 60 TCG had been stationed on detached service. At this time, the group resumed a tactical role and assumed responsibility for controlling all U.S. tactical airlift resources in Europe. The 60 TCG provided logistic airlift services to U.S. and Allied forces in Europe while maintaining host unit responsibilities at Rhein-Main. Operating the C-82, C-119, and C-47 aircraft, the wing participated in countless exercises and provided air transportability training to U.S. Army units.

In a major reorganization, the 322 AD reduced the headquarters elements of the 60 TCG, 309 TCG, and the 60 M & S Group to one officer and one airmen each on 15 November 1956. Was inactivated in 1957.

Briefly activated as the 60 Military Airlift Group in March 1978. Until February 979, airlifted personnel and cargo worldwide, controlling the 60 MAW's tactical squadrons. Participated in joint exercises and humanitarian airlift missions, including airlift following the Jonestown, Guyana murder-suicides, November 1978.

Modern era

On 28 October 1991, the 60th Operations Group activated under the "Objective Wing" concept adapted by the Air Force as the lines between tactical and strategic forces blurred. The flying components of the 60th Airlift Wing were reassigned to the newly established group. Upon activation, the 60 OG was bestowed the history, lineage and honors of the 60 Military Airlift Group and its predecessor units from the wing.

In 1991, commenced airlift in support of U.S. relief operations in Somalia during Operations PROVIDE RELIEF and RESTORE HOPE. Supported on-going operations in Southwest Asia during Operation SOUTHERN WATCH. Group elements also supported Operation PROVIDE COMFORT that provided relief for Kurdish refugees, assisted in the evacuation of military personnel and their dependents from the Philippines through Operation FIERY VIGIL in 1991, and supplied airlift support to Balkans peacekeeping missions beginning in 1995 with Operation JOINT ENDEAVOR, and continuing under Operations JOINT GUARD and JOINT FORGE. Deployed tanker and support elements to the European theater during Operation ALLIED FORCE from March–June 1999, as well as providing airlift support to other air expeditionary forces deploying to the operation.

Global War on Terrorism
America began air strikes against the Taliban and Al Qaeda forces on 7 October 2001, but the groundwork for success was laid in the weeks leading up to those attacks. Under Operation Enduring Freedom, a rapid mobilization requiring a tremendous effort from the personnel, supply, medical, security forces, finance, legal and chapel specialists charged with ensuring airmen were ready, trained and equipped to deploy.

The 60th Air Expeditionary Group was designated as a provisional unit under Air Mobility Command to activate or inactivate as necessary for combat operations of the 60th Operations Group. The military build-up at bare base locations on the other side of the globe put the strategic airlift capabilities of the Travis C-5 fleet to the test. In support of one forward operating location alone, Travis C-5s helped deliver more than 8 million tons of cargo and 2,500 passengers in the months of September and October.

When the bombers did launch 7 October, they reached their distant targets in Afghanistan only with the help of aerial refueling from Travis KC-10s of the 60th Air Expeditionary Group. Base tankers have kept up support of the air campaign from two major locations, offloading more than 120 million pounds of fuel to combat aircraft during the height of military operations. Travis KC-10s flew a year's worth of flying hours in less than six months since 11 September. Over 90 percent of these flying hours were flown in combat or in combat support.

In February 2002 C-17 Globemaster IIIs joined the 60th Air Expeditionary Group to carry warfighters and equipment into Afghanistan in support of Operation Enduring Freedom. When U.S. Central Command officials decided to put ground troops in Afghanistan, they called on the 101st Airborne Division from Fort Campbell, Ky. To get the soldiers to the fight, Air Mobility Command used C-17s and C-5 Galaxy airlifters to move the Army's air assault division into Afghanistan.

Lineage
 Established as 60th Transport Group on 20 November 1940
 Activated on 1 December 1940
 Re-designated 60th Troop Carrier Group on 7 July 1942
 Inactivated on 31 July 1945
 Activated on 30 September 1946
 Re-designated: 60th Troop Carrier Group, Medium, on 1 July 1948
 Re-designated: 60th Troop Carrier Group, Heavy, on 5 November 1948
 Re-designated: 60th Troop Carrier Group, Medium, on 16 November 1949
 Inactivated on 12 March 1957
 Re-designated 60th Military Airlift Group, and activated, on 6 March 1978
 Inactivated on 15 February 1979
 Re-designated 60th Operations Group on 28 October 1991
 Activated on 1 November 1991
 Designated 60th Air Expeditionary Group in September 2001 when group elements deployed to combat areas.

Assignments

 III Corps Area, 1 December 1940
 50th Transport Wing, 31 March 1942
 51st Transport (later, 51st Troop Carrier) Wing, 1 June 1942
 Eighth Air Force, 19 June 1942
 Twelfth Air Force, 14 September 1942
 51st Troop Carrier Wing, 20 February 1944
 Attached to No. 334 Wing RAF, Balkan Air Force, March–September 1944
 Air Transport Command, 26 May – 31 July 1945
 51st Troop Carrier Wing, 30 September 1946

 60th Troop Carrier Wing, Medium (later, 60th Troop Carrier Wing, Heavy; 60th Troop Carrier Wing, Medium), 1 July 1948 – 12 March 1957
 Attached to: 7320th Air Force Wing, 16–19 January 1949
 Attached to: 1st Air Lift Task Force, 20 January-26 September 1949
 60th Military Airlift Wing, 6 March 1978 – 15 February 1979
 60th Airlift Wing (later, 60th Air Mobility Wing), 1 November 1991–present

Components
 World War II
 10th Transport (later, Troop Carrier) Squadron (S6): 1 December 1940 – 31 July 1945; 30 September 1946 – 12 March 1957
 11th Transport (later, Troop Carrier) Squadron (7D): 1 December 1940 – 31 July 1945; 30 September 1946 – 12 March 1957
 12th Transport (later, Troop Carrier) Squadron (U5): 1 December 1940 – 31 July 1945; 30 September 1946 – 12 March 1957
 28th Transport (later, Troop Carrier) Squadron (3D): 20 April 1942 – 31 July 1945

 Cold War
 7th Military Airlift (later Airlift) Squadron: 6 March 1978 – 15 February 1979; 1 November 1991 – 1 October 1993
 22d Military Airlift (later, Airlift) Squadron: 6 March 1978 – 15 February 1979; 1 November 1991–present
 75th Military Airlift (later Airlift) Squadron: 6 March 1978 – 15 February 1979; 1 November 1991 – 1 October 1993
 86th Military Airlift (later, Airlift) Squadron: 6 March 1978 – 15 February 1979; 1 November 1991 – 1 October 1993.

 Modern era
 6th Air Refueling Squadron: 1 August 1995–present
 9th Air Refueling Squadron: 1 September 1994–present
 19th Airlift Squadron: 1 October 1993 – 30 September 1996
 20th Airlift Squadron: 1 October 1993 – 31 December 1997
 21st Airlift Squadron: 1 October 1993–present
 55th Weather Reconnaissance Squadron: 1 February-1 October 1993

Stations

 Olmsted Field, Pennsylvania, 1 December 1940
 Westover Field, Massachusetts, 21 May 1941 – 20 May 1942
 RAF Chelveston (AAF-105), England, 12 June 1942
 RAF Aldermaston (AAF-467), England, 7 August-7 November 1942
 Relizane Airfield, Algeria, 8 November 1942
 Thiersville Airfield, Algeria, 11 May 1943
 El Djem Airfield, Tunisia, 30 June 1943
 Ponte Olivo Airfield, Sicily, 31 August 1943
 Gerbini Airfield, Sicily, 29 October 1943
 Brindisi Airfield, Italy, 26 March 1944

 Pomigliano Airfield, Italy, 8 October 1944 – 23 May 1945
 Waller Field, Trinidad, 4 June – 31 July 1945
 Munich AFB, Germany, 30 September 1946
 Kaufbeuren AFB (later, Kaufbeuren AB), Germany, 14 May 1948
 Wiesbaden AB, Germany, 10 August 1948
 Kaufbeuren AB, Germany, 18 October 1948
 Wiesbaden AB, Germany, 15 December 1948
 Rhein-Main AB, Germany (later West Germany), 26 September 1949
 Dreux AB, France, 23 September 1955 – 12 March 1957
 Travis AFB, California, 6 March 1978 – 15 February 1979; November 1991–present

Aircraft

 C-52 Skytrain, 1941–1942
 C-47 Skytrain, 1942–1945, 1946–1948
 C-54 Skymaster, 1948–1949
 C-82 Packet, 1949–1953
 C-119 Flying Boxcar, 1953–1957

 C-141 Starlifter, 1978–1979, 1991–1997
 C-5 Galaxy, 1978–1979, 1991–present
 WC-135 Stratolifter, 1993
 KC-10 Extender, 1994–present
 C-17 Globemaster III, 2006–present

References

 Maurer, Maurer (1983). Air Force Combat Units of World War II. Maxwell AFB, Alabama: Office of Air Force History. .
 Freeman, Gregory, A.  The Forgotten 500: The Untold Story of the Men Who Risked All For the Greatest Rescue Mission of World War II. New York: New American Library, 2007.
 Rogers, Brian. United States Air Force Unit Designations Since 1978. Hinkley, UK: Midland Publications, 2005. .

External links

060